"Rock and Roll Preacher (Hallelujah I'm on Fire)" is a song by the British rock band Slade, released in 1982 as the fourth and final single from their tenth studio album Till Deaf Do Us Part. It was written by lead vocalist Noddy Holder and bassist Jim Lea, and produced by Slade. The song was released as a single in Germany only, where it peaked at No. 49.

Background
Following their revival after their performance at the 1980 Reading Festival, Slade signed a deal with RCA Records the following year. In November 1981, the band released the album Till Deaf Do Us Part. Following the March 1982 release of the third single, "Ruby Red", RCA and the band chose to release "Rock and Roll Preacher (Hallelujah I'm on Fire)" as a single in Germany only. For its release as a single, the full album version of the song was cut down to just over three minutes. The editing of the song was handled by Lea, Holder and drummer Don Powell.

The song would reach No. 49 in the German charts. Furthermore, the song became the band's regular opener at Slade's concerts. It would appear as the opening track of the band's 1982 live album Slade on Stage.

Release
"Rock and Roll Preacher (Hallelujah I'm on Fire)" was released on 7" and 12" vinyl by RCA in Germany only. The B-side, "Knuckle Sandwich Nancy", was taken from Till Deaf Do Us Part and had been the album's failed lead single in May 1981. The 12" vinyl version of the single was Slade's second release on 12" vinyl. It featured the full-length album version of "Rock and Roll Preacher (Hallelujah I'm on Fire)" as the A-side.

Promotion
In Germany, the band performed the song on the TV show Musikladen on 11 March 1982. Later in December 1984, the band would perform the song again on the German ZDF show Thommys Pop Show.

Critical reception
Upon release, Kerrang!, in a review of Till Deaf Do Us Part, said the song "comes close to capturing the feelings of Slade live, Holder chortling wickedly through every line". In a retrospective review, Geoff Ginsberg of AllMusic commented: "This number is so blistering, one wonders just how heavy these guys can get. Answer: very."

Formats
7" Single
"Rock and Roll Preacher (Hallelujah I'm on Fire)" - 3:17
"Knuckle Sandwich Nancy" - 3:09

12" Single
"Rock And Roll Preacher (Hallelujah I'm on Fire)" - 5:34
"Knuckle Sandwich Nancy" - 3:09

Chart performance

Personnel
Noddy Holder - lead vocals, guitar, producer
Dave Hill - lead guitar, backing vocals, producer
Jim Lea - bass, organ, backing vocals, producer
Don Powell - drums, producer

References

1981 songs
1982 singles
Slade songs
RCA Records singles
Songs written by Noddy Holder
Songs written by Jim Lea
Song recordings produced by Jim Lea
Song recordings produced by Noddy Holder
Song recordings produced by Dave Hill
Song recordings produced by Don Powell